Fred Linkmeyer, an American fencer, was a 3-time national épée champion.

He fenced primarily in Los Angeles, where he attended the University of Southern California.  He graduated from USC in 1931.

The USFA sanctioned USC Linkmeyer Invitational is held annually in his honor by the USC Fencing Club.

See also
 Fencing
 USFA
 USFA Hall of Fame

American male épée fencers
University of Southern California alumni
Year of birth missing
Year of death missing